Carlos Quiñones Velázquez [″Carlín″] (March 22, 1948 – March 16, 2000) was a relief pitcher in Major League Baseball. Listed at 5' 11", 180 lb., he batted and threw right handed.

Born in Loiza, Puerto Rico, Velázquez joined the Milwaukee Brewers of the American League during the 1973 midseason. He posted a 2–2 record and saved two games in his brief majors stint. He also pitched eight Minor league seasons from 1969 through 1976, going 46–48 with a 2.69 earned run average in 301 appearances.

Velázquez died in his hometown of Loiza at the age of 51.

See also
 List of Major League Baseball players from Puerto Rico

Sources

1948 births
2000 deaths
People from Loíza, Puerto Rico
Major League Baseball pitchers
Major League Baseball players from Puerto Rico
Milwaukee Brewers players
Clinton Pilots players
Danville Warriors players
Evansville Triplets players
Newark Co-Pilots players
Oklahoma City 89ers players
Puerto Rico Boricuas players
Sacramento Solons players
Spokane Indians players